Formula König was an open wheel racing series based in Germany and sponsored by German automobile company König Komfort- und Rennsitze GmbH (König comfort and racing seats GmbH). It ran from 1988 to 2004 as a single-seater feeder series. Its most famous champion was seven-time Formula One world champion, Michael Schumacher.

Scoring system

Champions

See also
German Formula Three Championship
ADAC Formel Masters
ADAC Volkswagen Polo Cup

External links
König Komfort- und Rennsitze GmbH official website (German)

Formula racing series
Defunct auto racing series
Formula racing
Auto racing series in Germany
Auto racing series in West Germany
One-make series